The 1994 Amstel Gold Race was the 29th edition of the annual road bicycle race "Amstel Gold Race", held on Sunday April 23, 1994, in the Dutch province of Limburg. The race stretched 250 kilometres, with the start in Heerlen and the finish in Maastricht. There were a total of 181 competitors, with 48 cyclists finishing the race.

Result

External links
Results

Amstel Gold Race
1994 in road cycling
1994 in Dutch sport
Amstel Gold Race
April 1994 sports events in Europe